
"The Evil That Men Do" is a song by the English heavy metal band Iron Maiden. It is the band's seventeenth single and the second from their seventh studio album, Seventh Son of a Seventh Son (1988). The single debuted at number six in the UK charts and quickly rose to number five. The single's B-sides are re-recordings of "Prowler" and "Charlotte the Harlot" which appear as tracks number one and seven/eight respectively on the band's debut album Iron Maiden.

The title of the song is taken from Marcus Antonius's speech while addressing the crowd of Romans after Caesar's murder (Act 3, scene 2, "The Forum") in William Shakespeare's Julius Caesar: "The evil that men do lives after them; The good is oft interred with their bones." Bruce Dickinson may sometimes repeat this before playing the song, but with the order of the clauses reversed (as he did in Rock in Rio). The poetic lyrics of the song are not related.

The guitar solo in "The Evil That Men Do" is played by Adrian Smith while the guitar solo in "Prowler '88" is played by Dave Murray. In "Charlotte the Harlot '88", the first guitar solo is played by Dave Murray followed by Adrian Smith.

The music video was filmed at The Forum in Inglewood, CA, during the Seventh Tour of a Seventh Tour in 1988.

Track listing
7" Single

12" Single

Covers
 An all-star cover of the song can be found on the tribute album Numbers from the Beast which features Fozzy frontman and AEW wrestler Chris Jericho on vocals, Paul Gilbert and Bob Kulick on guitar, Mike Inez on bass, and Brent Fitz on drums. It follows the basic layout of the song, but varies in terms of guitar solos and vocal harmonics.
 Symphonic metal band After Forever covered the song on their Exordium EP.
 A cover by the Finnish heavy metal band, Conquest, featuring Marko Hietala from Nightwish fame on co-vocals can be found on the tribute album Slave to the Power: The Iron Maiden Tribute
 The all-female tribute band The Iron Maidens covered the song on their 2008 EP The Root of All Evil.
 Swedish black metal band Naglfar covered the song on the Regain Records reissue of their album Vittra.
 Finnish progressive metal band Warmen have a song on their debut album "Unknown Soldier" called "The Evil That Warmen Do", assumingly taken from the Iron Maiden song of a similar name.
 Hellsongs also covered this song on their "Pieces of Heaven, a Glimpse of Hell" album.
 Iron Maiden acoustic tributeband Maiden uniteD made an acoustic cover in 2012 on their album "Across the Seventh Sea" featuring Apocalyptica cellist Perttu Kivilaakso.
 Band Крылья (Wings) from Ukraine covered that song with translated title and lyrics on their EP "Крылья". They version was named "То зло, что мы творим".
 A cover by German power metal band Powerwolf is available in the Deluxe Edition of their 2015 album Blessed & Possessed.
 English horror punk band Creeper recorded a piano-centric cover of the song as part of an all-star Iron Maiden tribute album, Maiden Heaven Volume 2, for Kerrang! magazine released in June 2016.

Versions

Personnel
Production credits are adapted from the 7 inch vinyl, 12 inch vinyl, and picture disc covers.
Iron Maiden
Bruce Dickinson – lead vocals
Dave Murray – guitar
Adrian Smith – lead guitar
Steve Harris – bass guitar, synthesizer
Nicko McBrain – drums
Production
Martin Birch – producer, engineer, mixing
Derek Riggs – cover illustration
Ross Halfin – photography

Chart performance

Notes

References

Iron Maiden songs
1988 singles
Songs written by Adrian Smith
Songs written by Steve Harris (musician)
Songs written by Bruce Dickinson
1988 songs
EMI Records singles